Materials Letters is an interdisciplinary, peer-reviewed journal published by Elsevier which according to its website "is dedicated to publishing novel, cutting edge reports of broad interest to the materials community."

Abstracting and indexing 
The journal is indexed in Inspec. According to the Journal Citation Reports, the journal has a 2020 impact factor of 3.423.

References

External links

Materials science journals
Elsevier academic journals
English-language journals
Publications established in 1982